...Is It Something I Said? is the fourth album by Richard Pryor and the first he released on a new contract with Warner Bros. Records, through its subsidiary Reprise Records. He remained with the parent label for the rest of his recording career.

Recorded at the Latin Casino in Cherry Hill, New Jersey, the album is notable for being the recorded debut of Pryor's memorable Mudbone, a rural Peorian teller of tall tales.

Content 
The disc's label credits the track "Just Us" as being "stolen" by Paul Mooney, Pryor's friend and collaborator. The album was recorded by Wally Heider Recording, and engineered by Biff Dawes and Charles Carver.

In 1976, the album won the Grammy Award for Best Comedy Recording.

The album was the first Richard Pryor record to be remastered and reissued on compact disc. The album appears as part of the ...And It's Deep Too! box set, with a bonus track, "Ali" (that first appeared on Richard Pryor's Greatest Hits) appended to the album.

Track listing
All tracks written by Richard Pryor, except where noted.

"Ali" is a bonus routine released as track 12 on some CD reissues.

See also
List of number-one R&B albums of 1975 (U.S.)

References

External links
Richard Pryor's Official Homepage

Richard Pryor live albums
Stand-up comedy albums
Spoken word albums by American artists
1975 live albums
Reprise Records live albums
Grammy Award for Best Comedy Album
1970s comedy albums